The Independence Jewelers were a minor league baseball team that played during the 1908 season. Based in Independence, Kansas, the team played in the Oklahoma–Kansas League. They were managed by Harry Truby. The team was the best-drawing squad in the league, with Sporting Life calling the city of Independence "baseball mad."

The most notable player on the 1908 Jewelers team was pitcher Gene Packard.  While pitching for Independence against Tulsa, Oklahoma on July 26, Packard had a single hit shutout victory.  On August 8 Packard pitched a game against Bartlesville, Oklahoma in which no Bartlesville player reached first base.  The headlines in the local newspaper described the perfect game as a world's record.

Timeline

References

Baseball teams established in 1908
Defunct minor league baseball teams
1908 establishments in Kansas
Independence, Kansas
1908 disestablishments in Kansas
Defunct baseball teams in Kansas
Baseball teams disestablished in 1908